Rangers played their first official match in competitive European football on 2 October 1956.

To date, the club has featured in over 300 matches and played in three UEFA sanctioned tournaments as well as an additional two other European competitions, namely the Inter-Cities Fairs Cup and the European Super Cup.

Overview

1960s to 1980s
The club's first ever match against European opponents, however, was a friendly match against Austrian side First Vienna in the 1903–04 season during a tour of Austria and Czechoslovakia which resulted in six victories from six matches. They won the match 7–2. The club's first competitive match was a European Cup second-round match against Nice. The match ended in a 2–1 home victory for Rangers thanks to goals from Max Murray (Rangers' first European goal scorer) and Billy Simpson.

In the 1960–61 season, Rangers took part in the inaugural European Cup Winners' Cup. In this season, they became the second British club to reach a European final (emulating Birmingham City, who had reached the final of the Inter-cities Fairs Cup the previous year), eventually losing 4–1 on aggregate to Fiorentina. Rangers were also runners-up to Bayern Munich in 1966–67. However, they did go on to win the trophy in 1972 after defeating Dynamo Moscow.

The 1982–83 season saw Rangers play in the UEFA Cup for the first time. They defeated Borussia Dortmund in the first round but were eliminated in the following round by 1. FC Köln.

1990s to 2000s
Rangers became the first Scottish club to appear in the UEFA Champions League, when in 1992 they defeated Danish side Lyngby in the first round. Rangers faced Leeds United in the second round in a tie dubbed the "Battle of Britain" due to the clubs being the respective champions of Scotland and England. In this, the inaugural season of the Champions League, the tournament was open only to national champions, with knock-out rounds leading to a group stage of eight teams in two groups of four, and only the winners of each group progressing to a one-off final match. Although unbeaten, Rangers finished second in Group A, one point behind French champions Marseille, who defeated Milan in the final. The French club were later involved in a match-fixing scandal and were stripped of their national title. It is not clear whether the group stage of the 1992–93 Champions League should be considered as a semi-final, given that the winners of each group went into the final, or as a quarter-final, given that it was contested by the last eight teams in the competition. However, Rangers' second-placed finish in their group made them one of the top four teams in that season's tournament – their highest ever finish in the Champions League and equalling their 1959–60 run to the semi-finals in its predecessor format of the competition, the European Cup.

In 1999–2000 under Dick Advocaat, the club had assembled a talented, cosmopolitan squad containing several Dutchmen and other internationals, at huge expense. They eliminated UEFA Cup holders Parma in the Champions League qualifying round, only to be drawn in a group containing two more of Europe's strongest teams: Bayern Munich were the 1999 runners-up, while Valencia were destined to be the 2000 runners-up, and those two clubs met in the 2001 final. Despite that quality of opposition, Rangers came close to eliminating Bayern, and after falling into the UEFA Cup, lost to Borussia Dortmund only via a last-minute goal and a penalty shootout. In the following campaign, they seemed poised to progress after beating Sturm Graz and Monaco in the first two rounds of group fixtures, only to collect just two more points and again finish third, with German opposition (Kaiserslautern) again swiftly ending UEFA Cup hopes.

In 2001–02, Rangers quickly dropped into the secondary competition and survived a late missed penalty to overcome Paris Saint-Germain (whose team included future Ballon d'Or winner Ronaldinho and Mikel Arteta who would soon move to Glasgow); they were knocked out by the eventual winners Feyenoord, inspired by former Celtic striker Pierre van Hooijdonk. By that time Alex McLeish had taken over from Advocaat, heralding an era of less lavish spending as the failures to succeed in Europe despite the heavy investment translated as worrying figures on Rangers' financial reports; this debt would later have dire consequences for the club, although in the short and medium term more domestic honours were won.

Rangers became the first Scottish club to qualify from both the Champions League group stage in 2005–06 and the UEFA Cup group stage in 2006–07.

Over a quarter of a century after their first appearance in the competition, Rangers reached the 2008 UEFA Cup Final. They played Russian side Zenit Saint Petersburg at the City of Manchester Stadium, but lost 2–0 after an exhausting season of football: aiming for four trophies, Rangers ultimately ended up with only two – the League Cup and Scottish Cup. The Manchester final saw a huge number of Rangers supporters make the short journey from Scotland, but the event was marred by serious disorder at one of the city's main 'fan zones' after the screen showing the match failed to function.

2010s to 2020s
The 2011–12 season was Rangers' 51st European campaign. However, due to entering administration in 2012 and the subsequent liquidation of the club's holding company, the new entity that was set up in its place, The Rangers International Football Club Plc, was restricted from European competition by UEFA for three seasons as rules stated they needed to present three years worth of accounts; Rangers were therefore not eligible for participation again until 2015–16.

Rangers next qualified for Europe having finished third in the 2016–17 Scottish Premiership, however their participation in the Europa League proved to be brief and disappointing, as semi-professionals Progrès Niederkorn of Luxembourg overturned a 1–0 deficit to win 2–0 at home and advance in the Second qualifying round. The next campaign in the same competition was more successful: Rangers successfully overcame four early rounds to reach the Group Stage, where the ability of all the teams was demonstrated to be around the same level; Rangers gave a decent account of themselves but ultimately finished third and failed to progress.

Rangers qualified for the Europa League for the second consecutive season in 2019–20, beating the likes of Midtjylland and Legia Warsaw in qualifying. They were placed in a group with Porto, Feyenoord and Young Boys. Rangers performed well in the Group stage, beating Porto and Feyenoord at Ibrox and drawing with both away. In their final match, Rangers led Young Boys 1–0 at Ibrox and were on course to progress as group winners, however an 89th-minute equaliser meant they finished 2nd behind Porto. Rangers were drawn against another Portuguese side, Braga, in the Round of 32. In the first leg at Ibrox, Rangers trailed 0–2 after 60 minutes but after an extraordinary comeback, won 3–2 thanks to a brace from Ianis Hagi and a goal from Joe Aribo, where he beat multiple Braga defenders to score. Rangers then won the second leg 1–0 in Portugal with a goal from Ryan Kent to progress 4–2 on aggregate. In the Round of 16, Rangers were knocked out by German side Bayer Leverkusen, losing 4–1 on aggregate.

In the 2020–21 season, Rangers again qualified for the Europa League Group stage, meaning they had made it to the same point for the third consecutive season under Steven Gerrard – without losing or even trailing in a qualifying match. Rangers achieved impressive results during the qualifying rounds (which were played as single matches behind very small crowds or none at all due to the COVID-19 pandemic in Europe), beating Willem II 4–0 away and Galatasaray 2–1 at Ibrox. They were placed in Group D with Benfica, Standard Liège and Lech Poznań and continued their strong run with an away win over Standard Liège, the first time the Belgians had lost a home tie in 16 matches.

In the 2022–23 UEFA Champions League, Rangers participated in the group stage for the first time since the 2010–11 season. Drawn against Napoli, Liverpool, and Ajax, they went on to lose all six group games and ended with a -20 goal difference which was the worst-ever performance in a group stage, 'beating' Dinamo Zagreb who finished on 0 points and -19 goals in 2011–12.

Matches

Record by country of opposition

Updated on 26 August 2021
 Pld – Played; W – Won; D – Drawn; L – Lost

Competition summary
Updated on 18 March 2021

Honours

Notes

References

Europe
Rangers